Nakagi Dam is a dam near Annaki, in the Gunma Prefecture of Japan.

Dams in Gunma Prefecture
Dams completed in 1959